Pembrokeshire is a county  in the south-west of Wales. In 2021 the population was approximately 123,700.

The Cadw/ICOMOS Register of Parks and Gardens of Special Historic Interest in Wales was established in 2002 and given statutory status in 2022. It is administered by Cadw, the historic environment agency of the Welsh Government. Elizabeth Whittle described Cadw as having a "somewhat special and guiding role" in the preservation of historic parks and gardens, since they are "an integral part of Welsh archaeological and architectural heritage". The register includes just under 400 sites, ranging from gardens of private houses, to cemeteries and public parks. Parks and gardens are listed at one of three grades, matching the grading system used for listed buildings. Grade I is the highest grade, for sites of exceptional interest; Grade II*, the next highest, denotes parks and gardens of more than special interest; while Grade II denotes nationally important sites of special interest.

There are 35 registered parks and gardens in Pembrokeshire. Three are listed at Grade I, eight at Grade II*, and 24 at Grade II.

Key

List of parks and gardens

|}

See also

 Scheduled monuments in Pembrokeshire
 Grade I listed buildings in Pembrokeshire
 Grade II* listed buildings in Pembrokeshire

Notes

References

Bibliography

Pembrokeshire
Pembrokeshire